Thomas Gershom Greer (1889 – after 1912) was a Scottish professional footballer who played in the English Football League for Birmingham.

Greer was born in Bathgate, West Lothian. He joined Birmingham from Coatbridge Rob Roy in December 1910, and made his debut in the Second Division on 21 January 1911, deputising for regular centre forward Jack Hall in a home game against Burnley which finished as a 1–1 draw. Greer played only once more for the first team, early the following season and again standing in for Hall. He moved on to Southern League club Reading in August 1912 and a season later joined fellow Southern League side Swansea Town.

References

1889 births
Year of death missing
People from Bathgate
Scottish footballers
Association football forwards
Birmingham City F.C. players
Reading F.C. players
Swansea City A.F.C. players
English Football League players
Southern Football League players
Date of birth missing
Place of death missing
Footballers from West Lothian